Lost Peak is a  mountain summit located within Olympic National Park in Jefferson County of Washington state. Part of the Olympic Mountains, Lost Peak is situated immediately northeast of Lost Pass, and is set within the Daniel J. Evans Wilderness. Precipitation runoff from the mountain drains east into the Dosewallips River, and west into headwaters of the Lost River. Neighbors include line parent Mount Cameron,  to the north, along with Mount Fromme and Mount Claywood, both  to the southwest. This landform's name has been officially adopted by the U.S. Board on Geographic Names. The origin of the "Lost" name is unknown, but a park ranger once described the river area as a "good place to get lost" because of the confusing and difficult travel.

Climate

Based on the Köppen climate classification, Lost Peak is located in the marine west coast climate zone of western North America. Most weather fronts originate in the Pacific Ocean, and travel east toward the Olympic Mountains. As fronts approach, they are forced upward by the peaks of the Olympic Range, causing them to drop their moisture in the form of rain or snowfall (Orographic lift). As a result, the Olympics experience high precipitation, especially during the winter months. During winter months, weather is usually cloudy, but due to high pressure systems over the Pacific Ocean that intensify during summer months, there is often little or no cloud cover during the summer. The months June through September offer the most favorable weather for viewing or climbing this mountain.

Geology

The Olympic Mountains are composed of obducted clastic wedge material and oceanic crust, primarily Eocene sandstone, turbidite, and basaltic oceanic crust. The mountains were sculpted during the Pleistocene era by erosion and glaciers advancing and retreating multiple times.

See also

 Olympic Mountains
 Geology of the Pacific Northwest

References

External links

 
 Weather forecast: Lost Peak

Olympic Mountains
Mountains of Washington (state)
Mountains of Jefferson County, Washington
Landforms of Olympic National Park
North American 1000 m summits